The 2015–16 season was the eleventh season of the current professional domestic soccer competition in Australia.

Domestic competitions

A-League

Finals series

W-League

Finals series

National Youth League

Grand final

National Premier Leagues

The 2015 National Premier Leagues Finals series began on 19 September 2015 and ended with the Grand Final on 3 October 2015. Blacktown City won the title for the first time.

Domestic cups

FFA Cup

The 2015 FFA Cup began on 29 July and ended on 7 November. It was the first season in which teams from all nine FFA member federations participated, with the Northern Territory participating for the first time.

National teams

Men's senior

Friendlies

FIFA World Cup qualification

2018 World Cup qualification matches also act as 2019 AFC Asian Cup qualification matches, following a change to the qualifying formats of both tournaments.

Men's under 23

Friendlies

AFC U-23 Championship

Men's under-20

AFF U-19 Youth Championship

Australia was scheduled to compete in the 2015 AFF U-19 Youth Championship tournament but withdrew before its commencement, citing a different strategy to preparations for 2016 AFC U-19 Championship qualification.

AFC U-19 Championship qualification

Men's under-17

Friendlies

AFF U-16 Youth Championship

AFC U-16 Championship qualification

FIFA U-17 World Cup

Women's senior

Friendlies

AFC Women's Olympic Qualifying Tournament

Women's under-20

AFC U-19 Women's Championship

Retirements
 7 July 2015: Matthew Nash, 34, former Sydney FC, Newcastle Jets and Central Coast Mariners goalkeeper.
 24 July 2015: Zenon Caravella, 32, former Sydney Olympic, New Zealand Knights, Gold Coast United, Adelaide United and Newcastle Jets midfielder.
 31 August 2015: Michael Turnbull, 34, former Marconi Staillions and New Zealand Knights goalkeeper.
 1 September 2015: Nadine Angerer, 36, former Germany and Brisbane Roar goalkeeper.
 13 October 2015: Alessandro Del Piero, 40, former Italy and Sydney FC forward.
 21 December 2015: Damien Duff, 36, former Republic of Ireland and Melbourne City winger.
 4 January 2016: Heather Garriock, 33, former Australia, Sydney FC and Western Sydney Wanderers midfielder.
 10 April 2016: Ben Sigmund, 35, former New Zealand, Football Kingz and Wellington Phoenix defender.
 30 April 2016: Shane Stefanutto, 36, former Australia, Brisbane Strikers, North Queensland Fury and Brisbane Roar defender.
 1 May 2016: Patrick Kisnorbo, 35, former Australia, South Melbourne and Melbourne City defender.
 8 May 2016: Ruben Zadkovich, 29, former Australia, Sydney FC, Newcastle Jets and Perth Glory midfielder.
 21 May 2016: Albert Riera, 32, former Auckland City and Wellington Phoenix midfielder.

References

External links
 Football Federation Australia official website

 
 
2015–16 in Australian women's soccer
Seasons in Australian soccer